Edmund Burns (September 27, 1892 – April 2, 1980 ) was an American actor. He was best known for his films of the silent 1920s, particularly The Princess from Hoboken (1927), Made for Love (1926), and After the Fog (1929), although he continued acting in films until 1936. Burn's first film appearance was an uncredited role as an extra in The Birth of a Nation (1915). Other films include  The Country Kid (1923), The Farmer from Texas (1925), Ransom (1928), The Adorable Outcast (1928), Hard to Get (1929), The Shadow of the Eagle (1932), Hollywood Boulevard (1936), and his last film, Charles Barton's Murder with Pictures (1936) for Paramount Pictures. He was sometimes billed as Edward Burns.

Partial filmography

 Diamonds and Pearls (1917)
 The Slave (1917) (as Edward Burns)
 Her Hour (1917) (as Edward Burns)
 The Wasp (1918) (as Edward Burns)
 The Danger Mark (1918) (as Edward Burns)
 Love Watches (1918)
 The Ordeal of Rosetta (1918)
 Under the Greenwood Tree (1918) (as Edward Burns)
 Marriage For Convenience (1919) (as Edward Burns)
 Male and Female (1919)
 Pegeen (1920)
 The Virgin of Stamboul (1920)
 Eyes of the Heart (1920)
 To Please One Woman (1920)
 Opened Shutters (1921)
 Hickville to Broadway (1921)
 Outlawed (1921)
 Fifty Candles (1921)
 East Is West (1922)
 The Lavender Bath Lady (1922)
 Lights of the Desert (1922)
 The Woman's Side (1922)
 The Dangerous Age (1923)
 Jazzmania (1923)
 Scars of Jealousy (1923)
 The Country Kid (1923)
 The Humming Bird (1924)
 Broadway After Dark (1924)
 Those Who Dare (1924)
 The Manicure Girl (1925)
 The Farmer from Texas (1925)
 The Million Dollar Handicap (1925)
 Made for Love (1926)
 Paris at Midnight (1926) 
 Out of the Storm (1926)
 Whispering Wires (1926)
 The Lodge in the Wilderness (1926)
 The Princess from Hoboken (1927)
 The Shamrock and the Rose (1927)
 The Chinese Parrot (1927)
 Ransom (1928)
 The Adorable Outcast (1928) 
 Phyllis of the Follies (1928)
 She Goes to War (1929)
 After the Fog (1929)
 Hard to Get (1929)
 Tanned Legs (1929)
 Sea Devils (1931)
 Hell-Bent for Frisco (1931)
 The Shadow of the Eagle (1932)
 The Death Kiss (1932)
 Western Limited (1932)
 Rusty Rides Alone (1933)
 Hollywood Boulevard (1936)

References

External links

American male film actors
American male silent film actors
1892 births
1980 deaths
Burials at Pacific View Memorial Park
Male actors from Philadelphia
20th-century American male actors